Daniele Buzzegoli (born 7 May 1983) is an Italia football coach and former player who works as a caretaker head coach for  club San Donato Tavarnelle.

Playing career
He played 2 seasons (4 games, no goals) in the Serie A for Empoli.

In January 2011 Buzzegoli was signed by Spezia for €100,000.

On 4 July 2012 he was swapped with Filippo Porcari. Both players were tagged for €800,000 in the financial accounts.

On 7 January 2019 he returned to Novara on a 1.5-year contract.

Coaching career
In June 2022, following a final season as a player with Serie D club San Donato Tavarnelle, and following the club's promotion to Serie C, Buzzegoli retired from active football in order to join the coaching staff of newly appointed manager Lamberto Magrini. On 14 November 2022, following Magrini's dismissal from his head coaching role, Buzzegoli was promoted as head coach on an interim basis.

Personal life
His grandfather Ivo Buzzegoli played in the Serie A in the 1940s.

References

External links
 
 

1983 births
Footballers from Florence
Living people
Italian footballers
Association football midfielders
Empoli F.C. players
F.C. Grosseto S.S.D. players
U.S. Massese 1919 players
Pisa S.C. players
A.S.D. Gallipoli Football 1909 players
S.S.D. Varese Calcio players
Spezia Calcio players
Novara F.C. players
Benevento Calcio players
Ascoli Calcio 1898 F.C. players
San Donato Tavarnelle players
Serie A players
Serie B players
Serie C players
Serie D players
Italian football managers
Serie C managers